Wigram is a New Zealand parliamentary electorate, returning one Member of Parliament to the New Zealand House of Representatives. The current MP for Wigram is Megan Woods of the Labour Party. She took over this position from Jim Anderton, who had held this position from 1996 until 2011.

Population centres
Through an amendment in the Electoral Act in 1965, the number of electorates in the South Island was fixed at 25, an increase of one since the 1962 electoral redistribution. It was accepted that through the more rapid population growth in the North Island, the number of its electorates would continue to increase, and to keep proportionality, three new electorates were allowed for in the 1967 electoral redistribution for the next election. In the North Island, five electorates were newly created and one electorate was reconstituted while three electorates were abolished. In the South Island, three electorates were newly created (including Wigram) and one electorate was reconstituted while three electorates were abolished. The overall effect of the required changes was highly disruptive to existing electorates, with all but three electorates having their boundaries altered.

Wigram is based around south-western Christchurch. The main suburbs in the seat are Spreydon, Addington, Hillmorton, Riccarton, Hornby and Sockburn. Following the 2013/2014 boundary review, it lost the suburb of Somerfield and parts of Hoon Hay to Port Hills. The electorate's name comes from the suburb of Wigram, and by extension the former Wigram Aerodrome, itself named after colonial businessman Sir Henry Wigram.

History
The electorate had previously existed from 1969 to 1978, when it was held by Mick Connelly for Labour.

Wigram was one of the original sixty-five Mixed Member Proportional (MMP) electorates created ahead of the 1996 election, when the number of South Island seats was reduced to sixteen. The formerly safe Labour seat of Sydenham lies at Wigram's core, and Labour's strong showing in the party vote in both 2002 and 2005, where the party won nearly half of all party votes cast, indicates that Wigram's political inclinations are left-leaning in nature. Its most well-known MP Jim Anderton was himself the Labour MP for Sydenham between 1984 and 1989, before he split from the party over its political directions and formed the NewLabour Party, which later merged into the Alliance; the Alliance disintegrated in 2002, but Anderton, by then the leader of the Progressive Party held off all challengers to easily hold the seat. The chairman of the Canterbury-Westland branch of the National Party, Roger Bridge, stated in April 2014 that Woods had a low profile and the Wigram electorate was now "winnable".

Members of Parliament
Unless otherwise stated, all MPs terms began and started at general elections.

Key

Election results

2020 election

2017 election

2014 election

2011 election

Electorate (as at 26 November 2011): 45,427

2008 election

2005 election

1999 election
Refer to Candidates in the New Zealand general election 1999 by electorate#Wigram for a list of candidates.

1996 election

1975 election

1972 election

1969 election

Table footnotes

Notes

References

External links
Electorate Profile  Parliamentary Library

New Zealand electorates
1969 establishments in New Zealand
Politics of Christchurch
1978 disestablishments in New Zealand
1996 establishments in New Zealand